Petro Koshelenko (born 22 February 1970) is a Russian former cyclist. He competed in the individual road race at the 1992 Summer Olympics for the Unified Team.

References

1970 births
Living people
Russian male cyclists
Olympic cyclists of the Unified Team
Cyclists at the 1992 Summer Olympics
Place of birth missing (living people)